The 2008–09 season of the Serie A is the 26th season of top-tier futsal in Italy, began October 25, 2008 and finished in June 2009.

League table

Playoff

Playout

Top goalscorers

Notes

External links 
 Divisione calcio a 5

Serie A (futsal) seasons
Italy
Futsal